The Triumphal arches for the arrival of Isabel II to Seville were triumphal arches that rose in the city of Seville in September 1862 to welcome Queen Isabel II of Spain and her husband Don Francis of Assisi, who arrived on the day 17 to the old former Cordoba Station located at the Campo de Marte, where it had arranged one arch, after which was placed in the place a street of flags and pennants by which marched the sovereigns together with the Dukes of Montpensier, who had come welcome to them.

From such Campo de Marte (today calle Arjona) were reached to the old Almacenes del Rey and up by the Reyes Católicos crossed the Puerta de Triana and by San Pablo, calle del Angel (today Rioja) and Tetuán arrived at the Plaza de la Infanta Isabel (the today Plaza Nueva), of where they took to the calle Génova and the Steps of the Cathedral, where they had other triumphal arch, just past which entered by the Seo by the front door. Then, after a Te deum, march through the calles de Santo Tomás -across a third arch-, Maese Rodrigo and Puerta de Jerez where by the then calle San Fernando were finally reached the Palacio de San Telmo, where reside the monarchs during those days of the visit.

Some consequence had that trip to the Queen for the city, because by royal disposition were eliminated some "toll gates" that had been paying for the introduction of various foods and objects in the city, was ceded to the municipality the old "Orchard del Retiro", which would lead to further urbanite beautification of the Prado de San Sebastián, were freed old excise taxes to porcelain factory Pickman in the Cartuja and, apart from other things, encouraged for a few days the fledgling tourism in the city, with the arrival of hundreds of strangers who came to the claim of the royal presence in it.

Charles Clifford was named by the sovereign as her "official photographer" during that trip, which the city of Seville was just a travel point courtship between visits thereof to the cities of Córdoba and Jerez de la Frontera.

References 

Demolished buildings and structures in Seville
Triumphal arches in Spain
Buildings and structures completed in 1862
Renaissance architecture in Seville
Renaissance Revival architecture in Spain
Monuments and memorials in Andalusia